Inside Living Things is a documentary short film by Linkin Park, released on June 19, 2012 through Warner Bros. Records and Machine Shop Records. The video was released a week before the band's fifth studio album, Living Things.

The release documented the band while recording their fifth studio album, Living Things. Unlike the other making of album video albums, this album was not included as a special edition DVD, but instead of that it was released as a video on the YouTube channel of the band. The video includes various footages from various videos from the "LPTV". The album was also previewed on Tumblr. The cover art of the album was the same which was used for the vinyl version of the album.

Missing Chapters
The video album consisted of many chapters but it had some missing chapters. The missing chapters included "Piledriver" (Making of Lies Greed Misery), "Apaches" (Making of Until it Breaks), "360 Body Scan", "Making of the Album Cover" and "The Story". All of these videos were uploaded by the band on their YouTube channel.

Chapter listing

Personnel

Linkin Park 
 Chester Bennington – lead vocals
 Rob Bourdon – drums, backing vocals
 Brad Delson – guitars, backing vocals
 Joe Hahn – DJ, sampling, backing vocals
 Dave "Phoenix" Farrell – bass, backing vocals
 Mike Shinoda – MC, vocals, beats, sampling, guitar

Production 
 Produced by: Mike Shinoda
 Edited by: Andrew Hayes
 Technical director: Linkin Park
 Art direction and design: Mike Shinoda

References 

American short documentary films
Linkin Park video albums
2012 films
Documentary films about heavy metal music and musicians
Warner Records video albums
2012 short documentary films
2010s American films